Knoxdale-Merivale (Ward 9) is a city ward in Ottawa, Ontario. Located in the city's west end, the ward is bordered to the east by the Rideau River and Fisher Avenue, the northern boundaries of the community of Barrhaven to the south, Ontario Highway 416 and Cedarview Road to the west and to the north by the Canadian National railway west of Merivale Road and Baseline Road to its east. It includes the communities of portions or all of Arlington Woods, Craig Henry, Tanglewood, Manordale, Crestview, Skyview, Parkwood Hills, Merivale Gardens, Grenfell Glen, Pineglen and Country Place.

Regional and city councillors
Prior to 1994, Nepean elected its regional councillors on an at large basis.

Gord Hunter (1994-2010)
Keith Egli (2010–2022)
Sean Devine (2022-present)

Election results

2022 Ottawa municipal election

2018 Ottawa municipal election

2014 Ottawa municipal election

2010 Ottawa municipal election

2006 Ottawa municipal election

2003 Ottawa municipal election

2000 Ottawa municipal election

1997 Ottawa-Carleton Regional Municipality elections

1994 Ottawa-Carleton Regional Municipality elections

References

External links
 Map of Knoxdale-Merivale Ward

Ottawa wards